Blue Miracle is a 2021 American drama film directed by Julio Quintana from a screenplay by Quintana and Chris Dowling. The film stars Dennis Quaid, Jimmy Gonzales, Raymond Cruz, Anthony Gonzalez, Dana Wheeler-Nicholson, Fernanda Urrejola and Bruce McGill. It was released by Netflix on May 27, 2021.

Blue Miracle was nominated for the GMA Dove Award for Inspirational Film/Series of the Year at the 2022 GMA Dove Awards.

Premise 
To save their orphanage (Casa Hogar in Cabo), a guardian and his kids partner with a washed-up boat captain for a chance to win a cash prize at a fishing tournament.

Cast
 Dennis Quaid as Wade
 Raymond Cruz as Hector
 Anthony Gonzalez as Geco
 Jimmy Gonzales as Omar
 Dana Wheeler-Nicholson as Tricia Bisbee
 Fernanda Urrejola as Becca
 Bruce McGill as Wayne
 Miguel Angel Garcia as Moco

Production 
Filming mostly took place in La Romana in the Dominican Republic, including at the Casa de Campo.

Soundtrack 
The film contains songs of the albums Panorama (Gawvi), Sin vergüenza and others produced by Reach Records.

 Fight For Me (Blue Miracle Version) – GAWVI feat. Lecrae and Tommy Royale (3:22)
 La Fiesta – Lecrae & Funky (3:32)
 Qué Pasó – GAWVI (3:36)
 Paradise – 1k Phew (3:21)
 Ambiente – WHATUPRG & Tommy Royale (3:12)
 Forty5 – GAWVI feat. Parris Chariz & Tommy Royale (4:03)
 Mejor – Antonio Redes (3:04)
 DICEN – GAWVI (3:51)
 BUSO – Tommy Royale & Angie Rose (3:08)
 NI AQUI – WHATUPRG (2:44)
 TRAPCHATA – GAWVI (4:43)

Reception
On review aggregator website Rotten Tomatoes, the film holds an approval rating of 68% based on 22 reviews, and an average rating of 5.8/10. The site's critics consensus reads: "Blue Miracle charts a familiar voyage, but viewers seeking an uplifting drama will be happily hooked on this fact-based film." On Metacritic, the film has a weighted average score of 48 out of 100 based on seven critics, indicating "mixed or average reviews".

Benjamin Lee of The Guardian gave the film 3 out 5 stars, saying "It's the sort of old-fashioned string-puller that when done well is hard to resist even if we know the strings are being pulled, like we're aware of the bait but powerless to resist."

References

External links
 
 
 Casa Hogar in Cabo

2021 films
2021 drama films
American children's adventure films
American children's drama films
English-language Netflix original films
2020s English-language films
2020s American films